FUMA may refer to:

 Flinders University Museum of Art
 Fork Union Military Academy
 Functional mapping and annotation of genetic associations